Courtney James Wildin (born 30 March 1996) is a footballer who most recently played as a defender for Southern League Premier Central side Coalville Town. Born in England, he represents the Antigua and Barbuda national team at international level.

Club career

Sheffield Wednesday
Wildin was a youth team player for Aston Villa, before joining Sheffield Wednesday as part of their development squad. In January 2016 he joined Gainsborough Trinity on loan.

In February 2016 he joined Lincoln City on loan before in March, he extended the loan until the end of the season.

He was then released by Sheffield Wednesday at the end of the season.

Boston United
After his release Wildin joined Boston United.

In December 2016 he joined Hednesford Town on loan before returning on completion of the month loan period. Wildin joined Corby Town on loan on 23 February 2017, and left the club again on 23 April.

Nuneaton Town
Wildin joined Nuneaton Town in May 2017 along with his brother, Luther Wildin In September he left the club when his contract was terminated by mutual consent.

Nantwich Town
In October he joined Nantwich Town.

Coalville Town
Wildin signed for Southern League Premier Central side Coalville Town on 9 June 2018.

In December 2018 he announced that he had been diagnosed with leukaemia.

International career
Wildin was called up by Antigua and Barbuda for the first time in May 2016 and made his full international debut as a second-half substitute on 4 June 2016 for in a Caribbean Cup qualifier against Puerto Rico

Personal life
Wildin is the brother of Stevenage and fellow Antigua and Barbuda defender Luther Wildin. The beginning of December 2018 he was diagnosed with leukaemia.

References

External links
 
 
 

Living people
1996 births
English sportspeople of Antigua and Barbuda descent
Antigua and Barbuda footballers
English footballers
Association football defenders
Antigua and Barbuda international footballers
Sheffield Wednesday F.C. players
Gainsborough Trinity F.C. players
Lincoln City F.C. players
Boston United F.C. players
Aston Villa F.C. players
Hednesford Town F.C. players
Nuneaton Borough F.C. players
Corby Town F.C. players
Nantwich Town F.C. players
Coalville Town F.C. players
Antigua and Barbuda expatriate footballers